Postal Ground is a cricket ground in Yavatmal, Vidarbha, India.  The ground has held two first-class matches, the first of which came in the 1985/86 Ranji Trophy when Vidarbha played the Railways, while the second saw Madhya Pradesh as the visitors in the 1989/90 Ranji Trophy.

References

External links
Postal Ground at ESPNcricinfo
Postal Ground at CricketArchive

Sports venues in Maharashtra
Cricket grounds in Maharashtra
Yavatmal
1985 establishments in Maharashtra
Sports venues completed in 1985
20th-century architecture in India